The Molkenhaus may refer to:
 Molkenhaus (Bad Harzburg), a popular destination in the Harz Mountains of Germany near Bad Harzburg
 Molkenhaus (Wernigerode), a historic building near Wernigerode belonging to the Harz National Park Authority
 The first factory of Carl Friedrich Schinkel in Bärwinkel (Neuhardenberg)